The Banqueting House is an 18th-century building, part of the Gibside estate, near Newcastle upon Tyne, England. Its style has been described as "Gothick".

A banqueting house is defined as a separate building reached through pleasure gardens from the main residence, whose use is purely for entertaining. The Gibside house was constructed in 1746, designed by Daniel Garrett for Sir George Bowes, much of whose large landholdings had coal underneath them, making him extremely wealthy. It stands in the highest part of the estate with fine views over the Derwent Valley. The estate fell into disrepair after it was left empty in the 1920s, and the Banqueting House itself soon became a derelict shell. The estate was eventually gifted to the National Trust by the Earl of Strathmore; they in turn leased parts of it to the Forestry Commission.

Conservation
The Landmark Trust, after negotiating a partial surrender of the Forestry Commission's lease, acquired the Banqueting House in 1977 and set to work restoring and renovating the property, with the work completed by 1981.

References

External links

Landmark Trust Website
Landmark Trust Banqueting House page

Landmark Trust properties in England
Buildings and structures in Gateshead
Gothic Revival architecture in Tyne and Wear
Grade I listed buildings in Tyne and Wear